The 2018 Missouri Valley Conference women's basketball tournament (also known as the Hoops in the Heartland Tournament) is part of the 2017–18 NCAA Division I women's basketball season and was played in Moline, Illinois, March 8–11, 2018, at the TaxSlayer Center. The tournament's winner will receive the Missouri Valley Conference's automatic bid to the 2018 NCAA tournament.

Tie-breaking procedures
1. Winner of head-to-head competition
2. If three or more teams are tied, regular-season competition among the tied teams shall be pooled into a “mini round-robin.” Teams shall be ranked according to their position in such a round-robin.
3. Power rating using MVC games:

4. The most recently available NCAA RPI ranking.

Seeds

Schedule

Tournament bracket

See also
 2018 Missouri Valley Conference men's basketball tournament

References

External links
Tournament Official Website
Missouri Valley Conference Official Website

2017–18 Missouri Valley Conference women's basketball season
Missouri Valley Conference women's basketball tournament